Rizwan Akbar (born 15 December 1986) is a Pakistani first-class cricketer who played for Rawalpindi cricket team.

References

External links
 

1986 births
Living people
Pakistani cricketers
Rawalpindi cricketers
Cricketers from Rawalpindi
Defence Housing Authority cricketers